Fifty-Fifty is an American silent drama film directed by Allan Dwan whose story was adapted for the screen by Robert Shirley. The Fine Arts Film Company production was made under the aegis of Triangle Film Corporation which released it on October 22, 1916. The leading roles are played by Norma Talmadge, J. W. Johnston, and Marie Chambers. A print of the film is in the George Eastman House Motion Picture Collection.

Plot
The title, which refers to the community property division of marital assets in divorce proceedings, foretells the dissolution of the union between financially secure Frederick Harmon (J. W. Johnston) and Naomi (Norma Talmadge), a fun-loving uninhibited artist whom her Bohemian artist friends affectionately reference as "the Nut".  The "other woman" (Marie Chambers), intent on misleading Harmon as to his wife's virtue and intentions completes the triangle.  The matter comes up for a resolution in front of a wise and experienced family court judge.

Cast
Norma Talmadge as Naomi Harmon
J. W. Johnston as Frederic Harmon
Marie Chambers as Helen Crew
Ruth Darling as Louise O'Mally
Harry Northrup as Former Prisoner
Frank Currier as Judge
Dodson Mitchell as Detective
Warner Richmond as Dandy

Remake
A 1925 remake also titled Fifty-fifty, set the story in Paris and New York, had a French director, Henri Diamant-Berger, and starred Hope Hampton, Lionel Barrymore and Louise Glaum.

References

External links

Fifty-Fifty at Hollywood.com
Fifty-Fifty at the American Film Institute Catalog of Feature Films
Fifty-Fifty lobby card

1916 films
Silent American drama films
American silent feature films
American black-and-white films
1916 drama films
Films directed by Allan Dwan
Surviving American silent films
1910s American films